"S.O.S." is a song recorded by French singer-songwriter Indila from the album Mini World.

Charts

References

External links 
 Official music video

2014 songs
French-language songs
Indila songs